German submarine U-1202 was a Type VIIC U-boat built for Nazi Germany's Kriegsmarine for service during World War II.
She was laid down on 28 April 1943 by Schichau-Werke, Danzig as yard number 1572, launched on 11 November 1943 and commissioned on 27 January 1944 under Kapitänleutnant Rolf Thomsen.

Design
German Type VIIC submarines were preceded by the shorter Type VIIB submarines. U-1202 had a displacement of  when at the surface and  while submerged. She had two shafts and two  propellers.

U-1202 was fitted with five  torpedo tubes (four fitted at the bow and one at the stern), fourteen torpedoes, one  SK C/35 naval gun, (220 rounds), one  Flak M42 and two twin  C/30 anti-aircraft guns. The boat had a complement of between forty-four and sixty.

Service history
The boat's career began with training at 8th U-boat Flotilla on 27 January 1944, followed by active service on 1 September 1944 as part of the 11th Flotilla for the remainder of her service.

Wolfpacks
U-1202 did not take part in any wolfpacks.

Fate
U-1202 surrendered on 9 May 1945 in Norway and, after being repaired, became Norwegian submarine HNoMS Kinn. She was not transferred to UK at the end of the war, as part of Operation Deadlight, since she was considered unseaworthy.

She served in the Royal Norwegian Navy until 1961; eventually being broken up in 1963.

Summary of raiding history

See also
 List of Royal Norwegian Navy ships#Navy vessels (past)
 Norwegian K-class submarine

References

Bibliography

External links

German Type VIIC submarines
1943 ships
U-boats commissioned in 1944
World War II submarines of Germany
Ships built in Danzig
Norwegian K-class submarines
Ships built by Schichau